Aimée Kelly (born 8 July 1993) is an English actress. She is best known for her debut leading role in the feature film Sket, for which she was nominated Best British Newcomer at the London Film Festival Awards. Kelly also starred in CBBC's hit drama Wolfblood as Maddy Smith, for which she was nominated Best Children's performer by BAFTA.

Early life and education
Kelly attended Sacred Heart Catholic High School. where her English teacher persuaded her to go further in performing arts when she was 11. She also did extra-curricular drama lessons at the Sage Academy of Performing Arts alongside her twin Katie. She boarded at Tring Park School for the Performing Arts in Hertfordshire for sixth form. Before being cast in Sket, Kelly worked as a waitress in a bar and as a shop assistant. She later went to university in Leeds.

Career
At 16, Kelly auditioned for the role of Minnie McGuinness in E4's Skins. After this audition, casting director Jane Ripley contacted Kelly about Sket. Kelly landed the role of Kayla Richards, making this her debut film, which earned Kelly a nomination for Best British Newcomer at the British Film Institute.<ref
name=Chron2011></ref> 

In 2013, Kelly was nominated for Best Performer at the British Academy Children's Awards for her performance as Maddy in the CBBC show Wolfblood. It was announced in 2014 that Kelly would be exiting the show to make time for university. She wrote "It wasn't an easy decision but sometimes education comes first! Thank you so much to all of you that supported me along the way! Xx".

In 2019 and 2020, Kelly appeared in Armando Iannucci's The Personal History of David Copperfield and the Roger Michell's The Duke respectively. The latter former premiered at the Toronto International Film Festival at the latter, at the Venice Film Festival.

Personal life
Kelly met photographer Alex Bibby while studying in Leeds and began a relationship. They were originally going to marry on their tenth anniversary, but the wedding was postponed due to the COVID-19 pandemic. They officially married in September 2022 at Burgh House in North London. The couple have a son, born March 2022.

Filmography

Film

Television

Music videos
 "Brave" (2022), Ella Henderson

References

External links
 
 Aimée Kelly at Spotlight
 

1993 births
21st-century English actresses
Actresses from Newcastle upon Tyne
English film actresses
English television actresses
Living people